Bryer may refer to

Given name
Bryer Schmegelsky (died 2019), Canadian fugitive

Surname
 Bob Bryer (born 1979), former member of the band, My Chemical Romance
 Constance Bryer (1870–1952), English suffragette and classical violinist
 Denise Bryer (1928–2021), English voice actress
 Lionel Bryer (1928–2006), South African-British youth arts promoter
 Tania Bryer (born 1962), British television personality
 Paul Bryers (born 1955), British film director, screenwriter, and fiction author

See also
Breyer (disambiguation)
Bryers
Bryerson (disambiguation)